Mayoral elections are currently regularly held in Salt Lake City, Utah, every four years to elect the city's mayor.

Elections before 1999

1999

The 1999 Salt Lake City mayoral election was held on November 2, 1999, to elect the Mayor of Salt Lake City, Utah. It saw the election of Rocky Anderson.

Incumbent mayor Deedee Corradini did not seek reelection.

Primary election
The nonpartisan primary election was held on October 7, 2003.

General election

2003

The 2003 Salt Lake City mayoral election took place on November 4, 2003, to elect the Mayor of Salt Lake City, Utah. It saw the reelection of incumbent mayor Rocky Anderson, who defeated former Democratic Party minority leader of the Utah House of Representatives Frank R. Pignanelli.

Primary election
The nonpartisan primary election was held on October 7, 2003.

General election

2007

The 2007 Salt Lake City mayoral election took place on November 6, 2007, to elect the Mayor of Salt Lake City, Utah. It saw the election of Ralph Becker.

Incumbent mayor Rocky Anderson did not seek reelection.

Primary election
The nonpartisan primary election was held on September 11, 2007.

General election

2011

The 2011 Salt Lake City mayoral election took place on November 8, 2011, to elect the Mayor of Salt Lake City, Utah. It saw the reelection of Ralph Becker.

Because only two candidates made the ballot, no primary election needed to be held.

General election
Challenging incumbent mayor  Ralph Becker was Republican retired businessman J. Allen Kimball. Kimball was widely unknown to voters, and was considered an underdog candidate.

2015

The 2015 Salt Lake City mayoral election took place on November 3, 2015, to elect the Mayor of Salt Lake City, Utah. The election was held concurrently with various other local elections, and was officially nonpartisan.

Incumbent Mayor Ralph Becker, a Democrat in office since 2008, sought a third term in office, but was defeated by Jackie Biskupski.

A primary election was held on August 11 to determine the two candidates that moved on to the November general election.

Candidates
Declared
 Ralph Becker, incumbent Mayor
 Jackie Biskupski, former State Representative
 George Chapman, community activist
 Luke Garrott, City Councilman
 Dave Robinson, businessman

Withdrawn
 Jim Dabakis, State Senator and former Chairman of the Utah Democratic Party

Declined
 Rocky Anderson, former Mayor and Justice Party nominee for President of the United States in 2012
 Kyle LaMalfa, City Councilman
 Charlie Luke, City Councilman
 Stan Penfold, City Councilman
 Jill Remington Love, Director of the Salt Lake City Community and Economic Development Department and former City Councilwoman

Primary election

General election

2019

The 2019 Salt Lake City mayoral election took place on November 5, 2019, to elect the mayor of Salt Lake City, Utah. The election was held concurrently with various other local elections, and is officially nonpartisan.

In what was regarded to be a surprise, first-term incumbent mayor Jackie Biskupski announced on March 16, 2019, that she would not be seeking a second term, citing "a “serious and complex family situation".

A primary election was held on August 15 to determine the two candidates that moved on to the November general election. Erin Mendenhall defeated Luz Escamilla in the runoff.

Primary election

General election

References